Ali Asghar Movasat, better known by his stage name DJ Aligator, is an Iranian-Danish producer and DJ.

Musical career
He enjoyed worldwide success with the single "The Whistle Song" from his 2000 debut album Payback Time. It peaked at number 5 in the United Kingdom in January 2002, and subsequently, he performed it on BBC Television's Top of the Pops. The song was a four times platinum selling success in Denmark (200,000 units) in 2000, peaking at number-one on both the singles and dance chart, before its international release in 2002.

"Lollipop" was written by Aliasghar Movasat and Calvin Allan, and "The Whistle Song" was written by Aliasghar Moavasat, Al Agami and Holger Lagerfeldt.

Discography

Studio albums

Singles

References

External links
 Official website
 
 

Living people
Danish electronic musicians
People from Tehran
Danish people of Iranian descent
Iranian DJs
Iranian electronic musicians
21st-century Danish musicians
Musicians of Iranian descent
1975 births
Extensive Music artists
Electronic dance music DJs